Copes is a surname and the plural of the word cope. Notable people called Copes include:

Elizabeth Copes (born 1976), Argentinian judoka
Erik Copes (born 1993), basketballplayer
Juan Carlos Copes (1931–2021), Tango dancer and choreographer
Parzival Copes (born 1924), Canadian economist

See also
Copes Bay, Nunavut, Canada
Cope (disambiguation)
Coping (disambiguation)